Kevin Santos Silva (born January 5, 1998) is an American professional soccer player who plays as a goalkeeper for Pittsburgh Riverhounds in the USL Championship.

Early and personal life
Silva was born in Bethlehem, Pennsylvania and has one younger brother.

Early and college career
Silva played at youth level for Players Development Academy. Prior to attending college, he was a two-time All-American and was ranked as the best high school goalkeeper in the country, as well as the number 13 overall player in the IMG 150 by Top Drawer Soccer and number 6 overall in College Soccer News' Top 150.

In 2016, he began attending UCLA playing college soccer for the UCLA Bruins. At UCLA he made 30 appearances in two seasons. In 2018, he transferred to Rutgers University, planned to join the Rutgers Scarlet Knights soccer team. However, after only training with the team, he departed ahead of the 2018 for a professional opportunity.

Club career
He spent the 2017 season with FC Golden State Force, making one appearance.

In July 2018 he signed for Scottish club Hearts. He moved on loan to Raith Rovers in September 2018, until January 14, 2019.

In May 2019, he signed on loan for Toronto FC II, and joined the club permanently in January 2020. He signed with the Toronto FC first team on July 3, 2020. In June he returned to Toronto II on loan. At the end of the 2021 season, the club declined his option for 2022.

On February 21, 2022, Silva signed with USL Championship side Pittsburgh Riverhounds.

International career
Silva has represented the United States at youth international level.

References

1998 births
Living people
American soccer players
United States men's youth international soccer players
UCLA Bruins men's soccer players
Rutgers Scarlet Knights men's soccer players
FC Golden State Force players
Heart of Midlothian F.C. players
Raith Rovers F.C. players
Toronto FC II players
Toronto FC players
Pittsburgh Riverhounds SC players
USL League Two players
USL League One players
Association football goalkeepers
American expatriate soccer players
American expatriate sportspeople in Scotland
Expatriate footballers in Scotland
American expatriate sportspeople in Canada
Expatriate soccer players in Canada
Soccer players from Pennsylvania